Islamiah College, is a general degree college located in Vaniyambadi, Tamil Nadu. The college is maintained and managed by the Vaniyambadi Muslim Educational Society(VMES),Vaniyambadi is a symbol of devotion to education and love of learning of the Muslims of Vaniyambadi. The college started functioning from July 1919 and it was affiliated to the University of Madras from 1921. It became a full-fledged First Grade college in 1946, Post-Graduate(PG) institution in 1974 and Research centre in 1986. The college has been affiliated to Thiruvalluvar University, Vellore from October 2002. It has been marching towards academic excellence which has culminated in the College becoming Autonomous from the academic year 2010-2011. It has been assessed and accredited by NAAC (3rd Cycle) with 'A' Grade from 2021. The college has entered into a new era of partnership in education with, Maulana Azad national Urdu University (MAANU), Aligarh Muslim University  (AMU) and Institute of cost of Accounts of India (ICAI), etc... This college offers different courses in arts, commerce and science.

Departments

Science
Physics
Chemistry
Mathematics
Biochemistry
Biotechnology
Computer Science
BCA Computer Applications

Arts and Commerce
Tamil
English
Arbic & Urdu
History
Economics
Business Administration
Commerce

Accreditation
The college is  recognized by the University Grants Commission (UGC).
The college is Accredited by NAAC (3rd Cycle) with 'A' Grade

References

External links

Educational institutions established in 1919
1919 establishments in India
Colleges affiliated to Thiruvalluvar University
Academic institutions formerly affiliated with the University of Madras